Cody Jones (born May 3, 1951) is a former American football player. He is a graduate from San Jose State University who played pro football from 1974–1982 for the Los Angeles Rams.

References

1951 births
Living people
Sportspeople from Manhattan, Kansas
Players of American football from Kansas
American football defensive linemen
San Jose State Spartans football players
Los Angeles Rams players
National Conference Pro Bowl players